State Route 205 (SR 205) is a state highway in Shelby County, Tennessee.

Route description

SR 205 begins in Collierville at SR 57 (locally known as East Poplar Avenue) and is known by the name Collierville-Arlington Road, as this is the main route between the two towns. It continues north through Collierville as four lanes until it reaches the Wolf River, where it becomes a two-lane road. It crosses the Wolf River at the only remaining non-channelized portion in Shelby County. Once out of Collierville, SR 205 passes through the unincorporated communities of Fisherville and Eads. It crosses SR 193 (known as Macon Road) and continues until US 64/SR 15.

North of US 64/SR 15, the road enters Arlington and becomes known as Airline Road. After passing over I-40, the route again becomes four lanes as it passes through the center of Arlington. It intersects US 70/US 79/SR 1 and follows it briefly to the east until it branches off and continues northward as a two-lane road. It is once again known as Collierville-Arlington Road as it crosses the Loosahatchie River. At an intersection, SR 205 turns left onto Millington-Arlington Road as Collierville-Arlington Road continues north until the Tipton County line where it continues as Hughes Road. 

SR 205 goes west from this junction and continues through the unincorporated town of Rosemark, where it crosses SR 14 (Austin Peay Highway). It then continues until it intersects Armour Road. SR 205 turns south briefly on this road until it goes west again and it becomes known as Navy Road. From here, it once again becomes four lanes and passes through Naval Support Activity Mid-South and Downtown Millington. SR 205 terminates at the intersection of US 51/SR 3 and Navy Road. The road continues as Martha Road into a subdivision.

History

SR 205 has been realigned and redesigned from Armour Road to Deadfall Road in order to straighten dangerous curves and join discontinuous sections. This portion of SR 205 carries a  speed limit.

Throughout the stretch between Arlington and Collierville, it is a narrow two-lane road with many dangerous curves that have contributed to several major accidents over the past few decades. Although it is a rural highway, the traffic volumes have increased on it due to people moving into the eastern part of the county. SR 385, (which has now become Interstate 269) was completed in November 2013 in order to bypass this road. After its opening, truck restrictions were placed on both SR 205 and SR 196.

Major intersections

References
Tennessee Department of Transportation
Tennessee Official Transportation Map

205
Collierville, Tennessee